Psalidognathus is a genus of beetles belonging to the family Cerambycidae.

List of species
 Psalidognathus antonkozlovi Noguchi & Santos-Silva, 2016 
 Psalidognathus cerberus Santos-Silva & Komiya, 2012
 Psalidognathus deyrollei Thomson, 1877
 Psalidognathus erythrocerus Reiche, 1840
 Psalidognathus friendi Gray, 1831
 Psalidognathus modestus Salazar, 2005
 Psalidognathus onorei Quentin & Villiers, 1983
 Psalidognathus pubescens Quentin & Villiers, 1983
 Psalidognathus reichei Quentin & Villiers, 1983
 Psalidognathus rufescens Quentin & Villiers, 1983
 Psalidognathus sallei Thomson, 1859
 Psalidognathus thomsoni Lameere, 1885
 Psalidognathus vershinini Zubov & Titarenko, 2019

References

 Catalogue of Life
 Biolib

Prioninae
Taxa named by John Edward Gray